Major General Oleg Aleksandrovich Kozlov (born April 20, 1963) is a Russian military officer and recipient of the Hero of the Russian Federation, which he received in 1996 for "courage and heroism in the performance of special assignments" during the First Chechen War during which he commanded a regiment of motorized infantry.

Early life
Kozlov was born in the village of Arzgir in Stavropol Krai in what was at that time the Soviet Union in 1963 to a family of workers. He graduated from School №1 in Arzgir in 1980, following which he entered the military academy.

Military service
After graduating from the Tashkent Higher Tank Command School in 1984 he was assigned to the reserve of the 40th Army of the Turkestan Military District, serving during the Soviet–Afghan War as a motorized infantry commander. Following the conclusion of the war, he served in Hungary, Turkmenistan and Belarus. In 1993, now under the banner of the Russian Federation, he graduated from the Military Academy of Armored Forces following which he served in the First Chechen War in the Republic of North Ossetia, partaking in two tours of duty; the first December 11, 1994 – April 27, 1995 and the second February 19, 1996 – October 8 that year.

By the end of his tours in Chechnya he had attained the rank of colonel and was awarded the title of Hero of the Russian Federation on October 19, 1996 by then-President Boris Yeltsin. He continued service in the military—serving as an assistant governor of Stavropol Krai, followed by his graduation from the Russian General Staff Academy and promotion to flag officer status. At the current time, he serves as the deputy commander of the Eastern Regional Command of the Russian internal troops, the MVD.

External links
 War Heroes.ru - Profile Oleg Kozlov (in Russian)

1963 births
Living people
People from Stavropol Krai
Heroes of the Russian Federation
Recipients of the Order of Courage
Russian military personnel
People of the Chechen wars
Soviet military personnel of the Soviet–Afghan War
Russian major generals
Military Academy of the General Staff of the Armed Forces of Russia alumni